The Argentière Hut (French: Refuge d'Argentière) is a refuge in the Mont Blanc massif in the Alps. Built in 1974 by the Club Alpin Français, it is located above the north bank of the Argentière Glacier in France at an altitude of 2,691 meters above sea level.

The hut is wardened and has places for 120 people. It is most usually reached by means of the Grands Montets cable-car, and gives access to classic climbing routes on peaks such as the Aiguille d'Argentière, Tour Noir, Les Courtes and the Aiguille Verte, as well as the steep ice routes of the north walls of the Triolet-Courtes-Droites-Verte chain of mountains.

References

External links
Argentière glacier and hut on French IGN mapping portal
Argentière Hut - official webpage

Mountain huts in the Alps
Mountain huts in France